The Strings Attached Tour was a concert tour by "Weird Al" Yankovic. The tour began on June 5, 2019 at the Ruth Eckerd Hall in Clearwater, Florida and ended on September 1, 2019 at the Verizon Arena in North Little Rock, Arkansas.

Background 
Throughout 2018, Yankovic performed concerts as part of his Ridiculously Self-Indulgent, Ill-Advised Vanity Tour. The tour saw Yankovic perform in small theaters and opera houses with sets focusing on his original songs and "style parodies." For the Strings Attached tour, Yankovic and his band performed with female backing singers and an orchestra. The orchestra was either a philharmonic or a collective of local musicians.  The tour was announced in October 2018. Yankovic announced the tour dates on November 12, 2018.

Setlist 
The following setlist was taken from www.weirdal.com. Missing are arguably Yankovic's best-known parodies, "Eat It" and "Fat", both originally from Michael Jackson. Yankovic pulled the songs after the airing of the HBO documentary Leaving Neverland, in which two men allege Jackson sexually abused them as children.

Main show

 Fun Zone
 Unplugged Medley: I Lost On Jeopardy/I Love Rocky Road/Like A Surgeon
The Biggest Ball of Twine in Minnesota
Word Crimes
One More Minute (every other show)
Jurassic Park
Don't Download This Song
Weasel Stomping Day
You Don't Love Me Anymore (every other show)
Tacky
Harvey the Wonder Hamster
Jackson Park Express
Smells Like Nirvana
Dare To Be Stupid
White & Nerdy
Amish Paradise
The Saga Begins
Yoda

Tour dates

References 

2019 concert tours
2019 in American music
"Weird Al" Yankovic concert tours
Concert tours of North America